Louise Olivereau (1884-1963) was an American anarchist and war resister. She was a trained stenographer and worked for the Industrial Workers of the World in their Seattle office. It was raided in 1917 during World War I because the group opposed the war. She was charged with and convicted of violation of the Espionage Act of 1917. On November 30, 1917, she was convicted and given a ten-year sentence. She served 28 months of the sentence before being released in March 1920.

References

1884 births
1963 deaths
American anarchists
American anti–World War I activists
American prisoners and detainees
American women trade unionists
Industrial Workers of the World members
People convicted under the Espionage Act of 1917
Trade unionists from Washington (state)